Sir Henry Rudolf Reichel (11 October 1856 – 22 June 1931), was a founder of the University of Wales.

Born in Belfast, the son of a future Bishop of Meath, Reichel was educated at Christ's Hospital and Balliol College, Oxford. He was a Fellow of All Souls College, Oxford, from 1880 until 1894
He was appointed the first principal of the University College of North Wales, in Bangor. He retained the post from the age of 28 until 1927 when he was 71.

Linked to the Nationalist movement of Wales, he was the vice-chancellor of the University of Wales for six terms. Knighted in 1907, he had a quiet and reserved character, but was celebrated by many in Wales, and many tributes were given upon his death in 1931.

In June 1901 he received an honorary doctorate (LL.D) from the University of Glasgow during the university´s 450th jubilee.

References

1856 births
1931 deaths
Knights Bachelor
Writers from Belfast
Alumni of Balliol College, Oxford
Fellows of All Souls College, Oxford
People associated with the University of Wales